Laguna Woods (Laguna, Spanish for "Lagoon") is a city in Orange County, California, United States. The population was 16,192 at the 2010 census, down from 16,507 at the 2000 census, with a median age of 78.

Laguna Woods became Orange County’s 32nd city on March 24, 1999, after local residents voted to separate from Laguna Hills. About ninety percent of the city consists of Laguna Woods Village, a private gated retirement community, formerly known as Leisure World. The other ten percent consists of businesses, some homes and the city hall, which are accessible to the public. Incorporation efforts in the late 1990s were largely driven by the need for residents to have a stronger voice against the prospective construction of an international airport at the nearby decommissioned Marine Corps Air Station El Toro. The airport proposal was defeated, and the land in question has been tabbed for development as the Orange County Great Park.

History
On May 15, 2022, a shooting occurred at the Geneva Presbyterian Church in Laguna Woods. One person was killed and five others were injured. The attack is believed to have been motivated by anti-Taiwanese sentiment.

Geography
Laguna Woods is located at  (33.609165, -117.732791).

It is bordered by Laguna Hills on the north and east, Aliso Viejo on the south, Laguna Beach on the southwest, the Crystal Cove State Park on the west, and Irvine on the northwest.

Demographics

2020
The 2020 United States Census reported a population of 17,701. The racial makeup was 74.4% White, .5% African American, 21.2% Asian, and 5.2% Hispanic or Latino of any race.

2010
At the 2010 census Laguna Woods had a population of 16,192. The racial makeup of Laguna Woods was 14,133 (87.3%) White (84.0% Non-Hispanic White), 110 (0.7%) African American, 24 (0.1%) Native American, 1,624 (10.0%) Asian, 10 (0.1%) Pacific Islander, 90 (0.6%) from other races, and 201 (1.2%) from two or more races. Hispanic or Latino of any race were 650 people (4.0%).

The census reported that 16,025 people (99.0% of the population) lived in households, 167 (1.0%) lived in non-institutionalized group quarters, and no one was institutionalized.

There were 11,302 households, 36 (0.3%) had children under the age of 18 living in them, 3,278 (29.0%) were married couples living together, 482 (4.3%) had a female householder with no husband present, 113 (1.0%) had a male householder with no wife present. There were 194 (1.7%) unmarried couples or partnerships, and 54 (0.5%) same-sex married couples or partnerships. 6,924 households (61.3%) were one person and 6,097 (53.9%) had someone living alone who was 65 or older. The average household size was 1.42. There were 3,873 families (34.3% of households); the average family size was 2.07.

The age distribution was 48 people (0.3%) under the age of 18, 56 people (0.3%) aged 18 to 24, 266 people (1.6%) aged 25 to 44, 2,948 people (18.2%) aged 45 to 64, and 12,874 people (79.5%) who were 65 or older. The median age was 77.0 years. For every 100 females, there were 55.1 males. For every 100 females age 18 and over, there were 55.0 males.

There were 13,016 housing units at an average density of 4,177.6 per square mile, of the occupied units 8,730 (77.2%) were owner-occupied and 2,572 (22.8%) were rented. The homeowner vacancy rate was 4.1%; the rental vacancy rate was 10.2%. 12,456 people (76.9% of the population) lived in owner-occupied housing units and 3,569 people (22.0%) lived in rental housing units.

According to the 2010 United States Census, Laguna Woods had a median household income of $36,818, with 9.9% of the population living below the federal poverty line.

2000
At the 2000 census there were 16,507 people in 11,699 households, including 3,989 families, in the city. The population density was 5,158.4 inhabitants per square mile (1,991.7/km). The racial makeup of the city was 96.12% White, 0.25% Black, 0.12% American Indian, 2.50% Asian, 0.05% Pacific Islander, 0.19% from other races, and 0.78% from two or more races. Hispanic or Latino of any race were 2.06%.

Of the 11,699 households 0.4% had children under the age of 18 living with them, 30.7% were married couples living together, 2.8% had a female householder with no husband present, and 65.9% were non-families. 62.2% of households were one person and 57.5% were one person aged 65 or older. The average household size was 1.40 and the average family size was 2.06.

The age distribution was 0.6% under the age of 18, 0.2% from 18 to 24, 2.2% from 25 to 44, 10.6% from 45 to 64, and 86.4% 65 or older. The median age was 78 years. For every 100 females, there were 51.8 males. For every 100 females age 18 and over, there were 51.6 males.

The median household income was $30,493 and the median family income  was $46,889. Males had a median income of $56,563 versus $35,188 for females. The per capita income for the city was $32,071. About 2.6% of families and 6.0% of the population were below the poverty line, including none of those under age 18 and 5.8% of those age 65 or over.

Government

According to the California Secretary of State, as of February 10, 2019, Laguna Woods has 14,027 registered voters. Of those, 5,081 (36.22%) are registered Republicans, 5,041 (35.94%) are registered Democrats, and 3,392 (24.18%) have declined to state a political party/are independents.

Infrastructure

Emergency services
Fire protection in Laguna Woods is provided by the Orange County Fire Authority with ambulance service by Care Ambulance Service. Law enforcement is provided by the Orange County Sheriff's Department. Security services are provided by Laguna Woods Village Security.

References

External links

 City of Laguna Woods

1999 establishments in California
Cities in Orange County, California
Retirement communities
Populated places established in 1999
Incorporated cities and towns in California